Nicky O'Daniel was an American actress on stage and screen. In Caldonia (film) she portrays the title character, a possessive girlfriend who convinces her man not to go to Hollywood for a film production but to stay New York City. She was one of the performers featured in the 1945 film It Happened in Harlem. A soundie titled The Pollard Jump (1946) includes her dancing.

Theater
 Early to Bed

Filmography
 It Happened in Harlem (1945)
 Caldonia (film) (1945)
 Swingtime Jamboree (1946)
 Rhythm in a Riff (1947)
 Harlem After Midnight (1947) as dancer. Edited from Rhythm in a Riff
 The Pollard Jump, a soundie

References

African-American female dancers
American film actresses
20th-century American actresses
20th-century African-American women
20th-century African-American people